Košarkaški klub Mladost SP, commonly referred to as Mladost SP, is a men's professional basketball club based in Smederevska Palanka, Serbia. They are currently competing in the Second Basketball League of Serbia.

Players 

 Nikola Čvorović

Head coaches 

  Marko Dimitrijević (2016–2017)
  Zoran Todorović (2017, 2018–2019)
  Milovan Bogojević (2019–2020)
  Zlatan Rakić (2020–2021)
  Ivan Stefanović (2021–present)

Trophies and awards

Trophies
 Second Regional League (West G2 Division) (4th-tier)
 Winners (1): 2013–14

References

External links
 Profile at srbijasport.net 
 Profile at eurobasket.com

Mladost
Mladost
Basketball teams established in 1970
1970 establishments in Serbia